Koo Ja-sung is a South Korean actor and model.

Filmography

Television series

Movies

Variety shows

References

External links 

Rakuten Viki | Koo Ja-sung
Koo Ja-sung (구자성) at HanCinema

21st-century South Korean male actors
South Korean male film actors
South Korean male television actors
Living people
1992 births